The 1981 New Mexico Lobos football team was an American football team that represented the University of New Mexico in the Western Athletic Conference (WAC) during the 1981 NCAA Division I-A football season.  In their second season under head coach Joe Morrison, the Lobos compiled a 4–7–1 record (3–4–1 against WAC opponents) and were outscored by a total of 231 to 225. 

The team's statistical leaders included Robin Gabriel with 1,783 passing yards, Mike D. Carter with 595 rushing yards, Keith Magee with 706 receiving yards, and kicker Pete Parks with 49 points scored.

Schedule

References

New Mexico
New Mexico Lobos football seasons
New Mexico Lobos football